Saxuality is the debut album by Dutch alto saxophonist Candy Dulfer. Some versions of the album include the worldwide hit single "Lily Was Here" with Dave Stewart.

The mainly instrumental album debuted on No. 4 in the Dutch album chart and was certified Gold. The album peaked at No. 22 on the US Billboard 200, No. 27 in the UK Albums Chart and sold in excess of one million copies worldwide. It was nominated for the Grammy Award for Best Contemporary Jazz Album. The album was promoted by a tour in Europe and the United States.

Track listing

Personnel 
 Candy Dulfer – saxophone, additional keyboards, vocals (2, 5, 9), arrangements (3)
 Ulco Bed – keyboards, guitars, synth bass, drum programming, additional percussion, vocals (2, 5, 9), arrangements (3, 10)
 Fred Anindjola – keyboards (8)
 Bobby Van De Berg – keyboards (9, 10)
 Frans Hendrix – computer programming, additional percussion
 Dave Stewart – guitar on "Lily Was Here"
 Dimitri Veltkamp – bass guitar (3, 7, 8)
 Michel Van Schie – bass guitar (5, 6, 9, 10)
 Edwin Rath – drums (3, 8)
 Martino Latupeirissa – percussion (7, 8, 9)
 Benjamin Herman – sax section (9)
 Wies Ingwersen – backing vocals (5, 10)
 Franklin Batta – vocals (10)
 Patricia Balrak – backing vocals (10)
 Hugh Kanza – backing vocals (10)

Production 
 Ulco Bed – producer 
 Candy Dulfer – producer 
 Frans Hendrix – recording 
 Susan Rogers – mixing at Westlake Audio (Los Angeles, California, USA)
 Bill Malina – mix assistant 
 Chris Bellman – mastering at Bernie Grundman Mastering (Hollywood, California, USA)
 Ron Gessel – art direction 
 Ron van der Vlugt – art direction 
 Frans Jansen – photography 
 Marcel van der Vlugt – photography
 Fase 2 – typesetting 
 Inge Dulfer – management

Charts

Weekly charts

Year-end charts

Sales and certifications

References

1990 debut albums
Candy Dulfer albums
Ariola Records albums